Bermudian or Bermudan refers to something of, or related to Bermuda or a person from Bermuda, or of Bermudian descent.

Bermudian or Bermudan may also refer to:
 Bermudian cuisine
 Bermudian English, the variety of English spoken in Bermuda
 Bermudian Landing, a village in Belize

In Pennsylvania
 Bermudian, Pennsylvania, an unincorporated community in Adams and York counties
 Bermudian Creek, in Washington Township, York County

See also
 
 

Language and nationality disambiguation pages